Ilokelesia is an extinct genus of abelisaurid theropod, preserved in the layers of the earliest Late Cretaceous of the Huincul Formation, Neuquén Group, located near Plaza Huincul, Neuquén Province, Argentina. The specimen, consisting of very fragmentary elements of the skull and the axial and appendicular skeleton, was described by Rodolfo Coria and Leonardo Salgado in late 1998.

Discovery and naming
Ilokelesia is only known from very fragmentary elements of the skull and the axial and appendicular skeleton, discovered in 1991. It was discovered ten meters away from where the holotype of Huinculsaurus was discovered. The genus was named and described in 1998.

Etymology 
The generic name's etymology is derived from the Mapuche language, ilo meaning "flesh" and kelesio, "lizard"; while the specific descriptor reflects the name of the locality where the fossil was found, Aguada Grande.

Description 
Ilokelesia was a medium-sized theropod. In 2010 Gregory S. Paul gave a length of 4 meters (13 ft) and a weight of 200 kg (440 lbs). In 2016 it was estimated to be  in length in a comprehensive analysis of abelisaur size. The same year another estimation listed it higher at 5.8 meters (19 ft) and 840 kg (1,850 lbs). It is characterized by features of the skull, namely of the quadrate and postorbital bones. The vertebral series also has distinctive characters setting it apart from other abelisaurs, such as reduced processes on the cervical vertebrae and dorsal vertebrae lacking pleurocoels.

I. aguadagrandensis was considered the most basal abelisaur described at the time, sharing characters, such as an expansion of the postorbital bone above the orbit and a flange of the same bone inside the orbit, with Abelisauridae and Noasauridae; but it was considered to retain primitive features for Abelisauria, such as an opening in the quadrate bone and a T-shaped postorbital. A subsequent analysis has placed it within Abelisauridae, as a brachyrostran carnotaurine.

See also 

 Timeline of ceratosaur research

References 

Brachyrostrans
Late Cretaceous dinosaurs of South America
Cenomanian life
Cretaceous Argentina
Fossils of Argentina
Huincul Formation
Fossil taxa described in 1998
Taxa named by Rodolfo Coria